Ingebjørg Karmhus (21 December 1936 – 26 February 2009) was a Norwegian politician for the Centre Party.

She was born in Leksvik as a daughter of Sverre Karmhus (1897–1974) and Karen Nicoline Bjerkan. She took basic education in Leksvik before attending Nesna Teachers' College for four years and the Norwegian Conservatory of Music for two and a half years. She worked as a teacher in Leksvik, Grav and Rosenborg, Trondheim.

She was the mayor of Leksvik from 1986 to 1999. She served as a deputy representative to the Parliament of Norway from Nord-Trøndelag during the term 1989–1993. In total she met during 162 days of parliamentary session.

References

1936 births
2009 deaths
People from Leksvik
Nesna University College alumni
Norwegian Academy of Music alumni
Deputy members of the Storting
Centre Party (Norway) politicians
Mayors of places in Nord-Trøndelag
Women members of the Storting
20th-century Norwegian women politicians
20th-century Norwegian politicians
Women mayors of places in Norway